Asia Motor Works Ltd (AMW) is an Indian automotive company that manufactures commercial vehicles, auto components, fully built vehicles and forged components. Founded in 2002, AMW has won Commercial Vehicle (CV) of the year 2008 from NDTV Profit Car and Bike Awards & "CV Innovation of the Year" for 2010 from CV Magazine & Zee Business News.

Operations
 

AMW's product range covers a range of heavy-duty applications in mining, construction, power, petroleum, roads and highways, other infrastructure projects and general cargo transportation.

AMW trucks design are based on the 1983-1996 Japanese Mitsubishi Fuso The Great.

The company's manufacturing facility in Bhuj, Western India is spread over 2 million sq. meters and produces vehicles for a range of civilian and defence applications. AMW has invested over Rs 20 billion in the plant and has a capacity to produce 50,000 vehicles a year. In addition AMW makes tipper bodies, trailers and other fully built vehicles at their plant.

The manufacturing includes assembly, axles and drivelines, frame shop and automated cab painting facilities.

AMW's vehicles are exported to the South Asian Association for Regional Cooperation nations including Nepal, Bhutan, Bangladesh and Myanmar

AMW manufactures components for the automotive and general engineering industries. AMW's capacity of 15 million wheel rims makes it the largest single location plant in Asia. The company supplies pressed metal components to the world's auto and white goods manufacturers. AMW has over 1500 touch points across India.

References

External links
Amwasia.com, the defunct official site of AsiaMotor Works, links to amwmotors.com and expired on 5 February 2020.
Capture of the Official Site of AsiaMotor Works.
Current Status of AMW Motors Ltd discussing legal and financial bailout.
Business Today article on Anirudh Bhuwalka and AMW
AMW news from The Hindu

Manufacturing companies based in Mumbai
Truck manufacturers of India
Vehicle manufacturing companies established in 2002
2002 establishments in Maharashtra
Indian brands